Tignac is a commune in the Ariège department in southwestern France.

Population
Inhabitants of Tignac are called Tignacois.

See also
Communes of the Ariège department

References

External links
(fr) Official website

Communes of Ariège (department)
Ariège communes articles needing translation from French Wikipedia